Fort Peck Lake, or Lake Fort Peck, is a major reservoir in Montana, formed by the Fort Peck Dam on the Missouri River.

The dam and reservoir were built in the 1930s to enhance navigation on the Missouri River, supplying enough water downstream of the dam to provide for a 9-foot deep, 300-foot wide navigation channel from Sioux City, Iowa, to the mouth of the Missouri just above St. Louis. Following severe flooding along the Missouri River in 1943, which hampered the economic development of the Missouri River Valley and damaged production of military supplies for then-ongoing World War II, five additional dams were added when the federal government adopted the Pick-Sloan Plan, calling for a series of dams and reservoirs to be built along the Missouri and its tributaries. Fort Peck Dam was built from 1933 to 1940 by the U.S. Army Corps of Engineers; water impoundment began in 1937 and the reservoir was first filled to capacity in 1947.

With a volume of  when full, Fort Peck is the fifth largest artificial lake in the United States. Along with the Missouri River, smaller tributaries such as the Musselshell River, Fourchette Creek, Timber Creek, Hell Creek and Dry Creek feed the reservoir; the latter forms the longest side arm of the reservoir, which reaches some  southwards.

The reservoir is also a tourist attraction, with 27 designated recreational sites bordering its shores. Bordering nearly the entire reservoir is the  Charles M. Russell National Wildlife Refuge, which has preserved much of the high prairie and hill country around the lake.

The lake is featured in the film Jurassic Park III, as part of an excavation.

Fishing 
Fishing is popular at the reservoir and a large variety of fish have been introduced into the lake.

See also
New Deal
Public Works Administration
List of lakes in Montana
List of largest reservoirs in the United States
List of reservoirs by volume

References

External links
U.S. Army Corps of Engineers - Fort Peck Dam and Lake
Ft. Peck Project - Recreation.gov, area recreation information, camping reservations
Charles M. Russell National Wildlife Refuge
Montana Department of Fish, Wildlife, and Parks
Fort Peck Lake at Big Sky Fishing
Fort Peck Lake Reservoir and Recreation Area

Reservoirs in Montana
Missouri River
Protected areas of Phillips County, Montana
Protected areas of Fergus County, Montana
Protected areas of Petroleum County, Montana
Protected areas of Garfield County, Montana
Protected areas of Valley County, Montana
Protected areas of McCone County, Montana
Bodies of water of Phillips County, Montana
Bodies of water of Fergus County, Montana
Bodies of water of Petroleum County, Montana
Bodies of water of Garfield County, Montana
Bodies of water of Valley County, Montana
Bodies of water of McCone County, Montana
1947 establishments in Montana
Fishing areas